Virgilio Riento (29 November 1889 – 7 September 1959) was an Italian actor and comedian. He appeared in 108 films between 1936 and 1959.

Life and career 
The son of a theatrical impresario, Riento made his debut on stage as a child, as an impersonator of Nicola Maldacea. A member of the Compagnia Lillipuziana stage company, he got his first personal success with the play Roma di notte (1911). In the first post-war, he got a large success in avanspettacolo with several macchiette, notably the Abruzzo peasant Donato Collacchione, and with the Michele Galdieri's comedy play È bello qualche volta andare a piedi (1941), alongside Tina Pica. In films, he had an intense career as a comedic character actor, being often paired with Pica.

Selected filmography

 Sette giorni all'altro mondo (1936) - Man on train
 Il signor Max (1937) - Pepe
 A Lady Did It (1938) - Pasquale
 For Men Only (1938) - Pasquale Pappalardo
 The Marquis of Ruvolito (1939) - Don Timurata
 I, His Father (1939) - Il cavaliere
 Department Store (1939) - Gaetano
 The Make Believe Pirates (1939)
 The Silent Partner''' (1939) - Il maggiore
 Il signore della taverna (1940) - Il vice-commissario
 Il ponte dei sospiri (1940) - Bertuccio
 Boccaccio (1940) - Il bottaro
 Miseria e nobiltà (1940) - Felice
 Il re del circo (1941) - Bastiani, suo zio
 L'attore scomparso (1941) - Il trovarobe
 Due cuori sotto sequestro (1941) - L'uffiziale giudiziario
 Teresa Venerdì (1941) - Antonio
 La scuola dei timidi (1941) - Roc
 Se io fossi onesto (1942) - Il direttore del carcere
 C'è un fantasma nel castello (1942) - Il poliziotto dilettante
 Finalmente soli (1942) - Il cugino Michele
 Arriviamo noi! (1942) - Il primo gestorio del "castello delle streghe"
 Before the Postman (1942) - Il controllore
 La maestrina (1942) - Pallone, il bidello
 Charley's Aunt (1943) - Casimiro, it tutore
 Il nostro prossimo (1943) - Il sacristano
 Annabella's Adventure (1943) - Il padre di Roberto
 Gente dell'aria (1943) - Pacini, il maresciallo della sussistenza
 La vita è bella (1943) - Matteo Boccaloni
 Non mi muovo! (1943) - Il portiere de la casa nuova
 Gli assi della risata (1943) - Pasquale Bellezza (segment "Il trionfo di Poppea") / Gervasio (segment "L'ombrello smarrito")
 Anything for a Song (1943) - L'industriale
 Arcobaleno (1943)
 Nessuno torna indietro (1945) - Don Alfonso Bortone - padre di Anna
 Vivere ancora (1945)
 I'll Sing No More (1945) - Roberto
 Chi l'ha visto? (1945) - Emilio
 Down with Misery (1945) - Gaetano Schioppa
 Peddlin' in Society (1946) - Don Nicola
 Il vento m'ha cantato una canzone (1947) - Scipione
 Lo sciopero dei milioni (1947)
 Fabiola (1949) - Pietro
 The Cadets of Gascony (1950) - Angelo Danati
 Donne e briganti (1950) - Fra Marco
 Rapture (1950) - Il capo della banda di Arcachon
 Sangue sul sagrato (1950)
 The Transporter (1950) - Il capo della banda di Arcachon
 Miracle in Milan (1951) - Il sergente delle guardie
 Beauties on Bicycles (1951) - Il padre di Marco
 I'm the Capataz (1951) - Il Guardiano
 It's Love That's Ruining Me (1951) - Proprietario Negozio
 La paura fa 90 (1951) - Barsilio, guardiano in seconda
 Una bruna indiavolata! (1951) - Cameriere
 Amor non ho... però... però (1951) - Il contadino
 Stasera sciopero (1951) - Augusto
 Tizio, Caio, Sempronio (1951) - Caio
 Porca miseria (1951) - Luigino
 Licenza premio (1951) - Enrico
 Ha fatto 13 (1951) - Cav. Brusaglia
 Viva il cinema! (1952) - Gambalesta
 The Passaguai Family Gets Rich (1952) - Cosimo Pedrozza
 Toto in Color (1952) - Tiburzi, il maestro
 Beauties in Capri (1952) - Il maresciallo
 Papà diventa mamma (1952)
 Falsehood (1952) - Il brigadiere Sante
 The Angels of the District (1952) - Cecco
 I, Hamlet (1952) - Anturio
 Giovinezza (1952) - Matteo
 The Piano Tuner Has Arrived (1952) - Bartolomeo Porretti
 Beauties on Motor Scooters (1952)
 Martin Toccaferro (1953) - Pasquale
 Bread, Love and Dreams (1953) - Don Emidio
 Lasciateci in pace (1953)
 Condannatelo! (1953) - Don Benedetto
 Café chantant (1953) - Zio Angelino
 Matrimonial Agency (1953) - Padre di Peppino
 A Day in Court (1954) - Virgilio Pampinelli
 100 Years of Love (1954) - The Police Commissioner (segment "Nozze d'Oro")
 The Three Thieves (1954) - Commissario Zanini
 Piccola santa (1954) - Nicola
 Bread, Love and Jealousy (1954) - Don Emidio
 Le vacanze del sor Clemente (1955) - Angelino
 The Sign of Venus (1955) - Padre di Agnese
 The White Angel (1955) - Il dottor Marini
 Cantate con noi (1955) - Pasquale
 Ore 10: lezione di canto (1955) - Beniamino, il guardiano
 The Miller's Beautiful Wife (1955) - Salvatore
 Scandal in Sorrento (1955) - Don Emidio
 Il campanile d'oro (1955)
 Eighteen Year Olds (1955) - Il portiere del collegio
 Donatella (1956) - Nicola, Donatella's uncle
 Tempo di villeggiatura (1956) - Frate Serafino
 Guaglione (1956) - Rocco - Guitar player
 La capinera del mulino (1956) - Anselmo
 Donne, amore e matrimoni (1956) - Vincenzo Domenicantonio
 Cantando sotto le stelle (1956) - Virgilio
 Arriva la zia d'America (1956) - Eugenio - l'amministratore
 Poveri ma belli (1957) - Giovanna's Father
 Doctor and the Healer (1957) - Umberto
 Il cocco di mamma (1957) - Aldo Manca's Father
 La zia d'America va a sciare (1957) - Il cavalier Eugenio
 Napoli, sole mio! (1958) - Don Nicolino Brunati
 Domenica è sempre domenica (1958) - The Bailiff
 El hombre del paraguas blanco (1958) - El cura
 È arrivata la parigina (1958) - Antonio
 Serenatella sciuè sciuè (1958) - Salvatore Scuoffolo
 Prepotenti più di prima (1959) - Il maresciallo
 World of Miracles (1959) - Oscaretto - il suggeritore
 Simpatico mascalzone (1959) - Onofrio
 Perfide.... ma belle'' (1959) - Gaspare

References

External links

1889 births
1959 deaths
Road incident deaths in Italy
Italian male film actors
20th-century Italian male actors